The Way We Were is the thirty-second studio album by American pop singer Andy Williams, released in the spring of 1974 by Columbia Records and was a return to singing songs that his audience was already familiar with after Solitaire, his previous LP that was less reliant on covers of recent pop hits, did not perform well.

This was his first studio album out of 25 released by Columbia that didn't make either the Billboard 200 or Christmas Albums charts, but it did reach number seven in the UK during a 10-week run that began on June 15 of that year.  The UK release featured a different cover photo, but the track listing for both versions was the same.  On December 1, 1974, the British Phonographic Industry awarded the album with Silver certification for sales of 60,000 units in the UK.

The single "Love's Theme" entered Billboard magazine's list of the 40 most popular Easy Listening songs of the week in the US in the issue dated June 8, 1974, and stayed on the chart for 11 weeks, peaking at number 16.

The Way We Were was released on compact disc for the first time as one of two albums on one CD by Collectables Records on January 22, 2002, the other album being Williams's Columbia release from the spring of 1972, Love Theme from "The Godfather".  Collectables included this CD in a box set entitled Classic Album Collection, Vol. 2, which contains 15 of his studio albums and two compilations and was released on November 29, 2002.

Reception

Billboard felt that the album would succeed. "Once more, Williams brings home a winner. Well-paced throughout, this disk delivers Williams at his best—gliding smoothly through each tune with his unique ability to finesse a lyric to the fullest. Full arrangements and studio mix a definite plus."

Track listing

Side one
 "You're the Best Thing That Ever Happened to Me" (Jim Weatherly) - 4:20
 "I Won't Last a Day Without You" (Roger Nichols, Paul Williams) - 5:19
 "Killing Me Softly with Her Song" (Charles Fox, Norman Gimbel) - 4:31
 "Touch Me in the Morning" (Michael Masser, Ron Miller) - 3:55
 "Love's Theme" (Aaron Schroeder, Barry White) - 2:59

Side two
 "Sunshine on My Shoulders" (John Denver, Dick Kniss, Mike Taylor) - 3:11
 "The Way We Were" from The Way We Were (Alan Bergman, Marilyn Bergman, Marvin Hamlisch) - 3:18
 "The Most Beautiful Girl" (Rory Michael Bourke, Billy Sherrill, Norris Wilson) - 3:12
 "Seasons in the Sun" (Jacques Brel, Rod McKuen) - 4:41
 "If I Could Only Go Back Again" (Mike Curb, Alan Osmond) - 3:06

Song information

Ray Price's recording of "You're the Best Thing That Ever Happened to Me" reached number one on Billboard magazine's Country chart, and the version of the song by Gladys Knight & the Pips, which used the title "Best Thing That Ever Happened to Me", went to number one on the magazine's R&B chart. The highest charting rendition of "I Won't Last a Day Without You" was by The Carpenters, who took the song to number one on the magazine's list of the most popular Easy Listening recordings. "Killing Me Softly with His Song" by Roberta Flack had its best chart appearance as a number one hit on the Billboard Hot 100, and Diana Ross also reached number one pop as well as number one Easy Listening with "Touch Me in the Morning".

"Love's Theme" originated as an instrumental recording by the Love Unlimited Orchestra that peaked at number one on both the Hot 100 and Easy Listening charts. John Denver's "Sunshine on My Shoulders" also went to the top spot on the pop and Easy Listening charts, as did Barbra Streisand's "The Way We Were".  "The Most Beautiful Girl" by Charlie Rich went number one Country, pop, and Easy Listening, and Terry Jacks reached number one on the pop and Easy Listening charts and the UK singles chart with "Seasons in the Sun".

Personnel
From the liner notes for the original album:

Andy Williams - vocals
Mike Curb - producer
Don Costa - arranger ("Love's Theme", "If I Could Only Go Back Again"), director of arrangements
Ralph Ferraro - arranger ("I Won't Last a Day without You", "Killing Me Softly with Her Song", "Sunshine on My Shoulders", "Seasons in the Sun")
Edward Karam - arranger ("Touch Me in the Morning", "The Way We Were")
Nick Perito - arranger ("You're the Best Thing That Ever Happened to Me", "The Most Beautiful Girl")
Ed Greene - engineer
Michael Lloyd - engineer
John Puckett - engineer
Keats Tyler - photography
Anne Garner - design

References

Bibliography

1974 albums
Andy Williams albums
Columbia Records albums
Albums arranged by Don Costa
Albums produced by Mike Curb